Manihot esculenta, commonly called cassava, manioc, or yuca (among numerous regional names), is a woody shrub  of the spurge family, Euphorbiaceae, native to South America. Although a perennial plant, cassava is extensively cultivated as an annual crop in tropical and subtropical regions for its edible starchy tuberous root, a major source of carbohydrates. Though it is often called yuca in parts of Spanish America and in the United States, it is not related to yucca, a shrub in the family Asparagaceae. Cassava is predominantly consumed in boiled form, but substantial quantities are used to extract cassava starch, called tapioca, which is used for food, animal feed, and industrial purposes. The Brazilian farinha, and the related garri of West Africa, is an edible coarse flour obtained by grating cassava roots, pressing moisture off the obtained grated pulp, and finally drying it (and roasting both in the case of farinha and garri).

Cassava is the third-largest source of food carbohydrates in the tropics, after rice and maize. Cassava is a major staple food in the developing world, providing a basic diet for over half a billion people. It is one of the most drought-tolerant crops, capable of growing on marginal soils. Nigeria is the world's largest producer of cassava, while Thailand is the largest exporter of cassava starch.

Cassava is classified as either sweet or bitter. Like other roots and tubers, both bitter and sweet varieties of cassava contain antinutritional factors and toxins, with the bitter varieties containing much larger amounts. It must be properly prepared before consumption, as improper preparation of cassava can leave enough residual cyanide to cause acute cyanide intoxication, goiter, ataxia, partial paralysis, or death. The more toxic varieties of cassava have been used in some places as famine food during times of food insecurity. Farmers often prefer the bitter varieties because they deter pests, animals, and thieves.

Description

A woody vascular bundle runs along the root's axis. The flesh can be chalk-white or yellowish. Cassava roots are very rich in starch and contain small amounts of calcium (16 milligrams per 100 grams), phosphorus (27 mg/100 g), and vitamin C (20.6 mg/100 g). However, they are poor in protein and other nutrients. In contrast, cassava leaves are a good source of protein for animal and human
nutrition, but deficient in the amino acid methionine.

Genome 
The complete and haplotype-resolved African cassava (TME204) genome was reconstructed and made available using the Hi-C technology. The genome shows abundant novel gene loci with enriched functionality related to chromatin organization, meristem development, and cell responses. Differentially expressed transcripts of different haplotype origins were enriched for different functionality during tissue development. In each tissue, 20–30% of transcripts showed allele-specific expression differences with <2% of direction-shifting. Despite high gene synteny, the HiFi genome assembly revealed extensive chromosome rearrangements and abundant intra-genomic and inter-genomic divergent sequences, with significant structural variations mostly related to long terminal repeat retrotransposons.

Although smallholders are otherwise economically inefficient producers, they are vital to producitivity at particular times. Small cassava farmers are no exception. Genetic diversity is vital when productivity has declined due to pests and diseases, and smallholders tend to retain less productive but more diverse gene pools.

Storage tuber 
 (FT) is a gene producing FT proteins which affect the formation of storage roots in many plants, including this one. Alleles in cassava include MeFT1 and MeFT2. MeFT1 expression in leaves seems to not be photoperiodic, while MeFT2 clearly is. MeFT1 expression encourages motivation of sucrose towards the reproductive organs, as shown by experimental overexpression reducing storage root accumulation.

Taxonomy

History 

Wild populations of M. esculenta subspecies flabellifolia, shown to be the progenitor of domesticated cassava, are centered in west-central Brazil, where it was likely first domesticated no more than 10,000 years BP. Forms of the modern domesticated species can also be found growing in the wild in the south of Brazil. By 4,600 BC, cassava pollen appears in the Gulf of Mexico lowlands, at the San Andrés archaeological site. The oldest direct evidence of cassava cultivation comes from a 1,400-year-old Maya site, Joya de Cerén, in El Salvador. With its high food potential, it had become a staple food of the native populations of northern South America, southern Mesoamerica, and the Taino people in the Caribbean islands, who grew it using a high-yielding form of shifting agriculture by the time of European contact in 1492. Cassava was a staple food of pre-Columbian peoples in the Americas and is often portrayed in indigenous art. The Moche people often depicted yuca in their ceramics.

Spaniards in their early occupation of Caribbean islands did not want to eat cassava or maize, which they considered insubstantial, dangerous, and not nutritious. They much preferred foods from Spain, specifically wheat bread, olive oil, red wine, and meat, and considered maize and cassava damaging to Europeans. The cultivation and consumption of cassava were nonetheless continued in both Portuguese and Spanish America. Mass production of cassava bread became the first Cuban industry established by the Spanish. Ships departing to Europe from Cuban ports such as Havana, Santiago, Bayamo, and Baracoa carried goods to Spain, but sailors needed to be provisioned for the voyage. The Spanish also needed to replenish their boats with dried meat, water, fruit, and large amounts of cassava bread. Sailors complained that it caused them digestive problems. Tropical Cuban weather was not suitable for wheat planting and cassava would not go stale as quickly as regular bread.

Cassava was introduced to Africa by Portuguese traders from Brazil in the 16th century. Around the same period, it was also introduced to Asia through Columbian Exchange by Portuguese and Spanish traders, planted in their colonies in Goa, Malacca, Eastern Indonesia, Timor and the Philippines. Maize and cassava are now important staple foods, replacing native African crops in places such as Tanzania. Cassava has also become an important crop in Asia. While it is a valued food staple in parts of eastern Indonesia, it is primarily cultivated for starch extraction and bio-fuel production in Thailand, Cambodia and Vietnam. Cassava is sometimes described as the "bread of the tropics" but should not be confused with the tropical and equatorial bread tree (Encephalartos), the breadfruit (Artocarpus altilis) or the African breadfruit (Treculia africana). This description definitely holds in Africa and parts of South America; in Asian countries such as Vietnam fresh cassava barely features in human diets.

There is a legend that cassava was introduced in 1880–1885 CE to the South Indian state of Kerala by the King of Travancore, Vishakham Thirunal Maharaja, after a great famine hit the kingdom, as a substitute for rice. However, there are documented cases of cassava cultivation in parts of the state before the time of Vishakham Thirunal Maharaja. Cassava is called kappa or maricheeni in Malayalam. It is also referred to as tapioca in Indian English usage.

Cultivation

Pests 

A major cause of losses during cassava storage is infestation by insects. A wide range of species that feed directly on dried cassava chips have been reported as a major factor in spoiling stored cassava, with losses between 19% and 30% of the harvested produce. In Africa, a previous issue was the cassava mealybug (Phenacoccus manihoti) and cassava green mite (Mononychellus tanajoa). These pests can cause up to 80 percent crop loss, which is extremely detrimental to the production of subsistence farmers. These pests were rampant in the 1970s and 1980s but were brought under control following the establishment of the Biological Control Centre for Africa of the International Institute of Tropical Agriculture (IITA) under the leadership of Hans Rudolf Herren. The Centre investigated biological control for cassava pests; two South American natural enemies Anagyrus lopezi (a parasitoid wasp) and Typhlodromalus aripo (a predatory mite) were found to effectively control the cassava mealybug and the cassava green mite, respectively.

Xanthomonas axonopodis pv. manihotis causes bacterial blight of cassava. This disease originated in South America and has followed cassava around the world. Bacterial blight has been responsible for near catastrophic losses and famine in past decades, and its mitigation requires active management practices. Several other bacteria also attack cassava, including the related Xanthomonas campestris pv. cassavae, which causes bacterial angular leaf spot.

Several viruses are of economic importance. The African cassava mosaic virus causes the leaves of the cassava plant to wither, limiting the growth of the root. An outbreak of the virus in Africa in the 1920s led to a major famine. The virus is spread by the whitefly and by the transplanting of diseased plants into new fields. Sometime in the late-1980s, a mutation occurred in Uganda that made the virus even more harmful, causing the complete loss of leaves. Altogether viruses are a severe production limitation in the tropics. They are the primary reason for the complete lack of yield increases in the 25 years .

Cassava brown streak virus disease has been identified as a major threat to cultivation worldwide. Cassava mosaic virus (CMV) is widespread in Africa, causing cassava mosaic disease (CMD). Bredeson et al 2016 find the M. esculenta cultivars most widely used on that continent have M. carthaginensis subsp. glaziovii genes of which some appear to be CMD resistance genes. Although the ongoing CMD pandemic affects both East and Central Africa, Legg et al. found that these two areas have two distinct subpopulations of the vector, Bemisia tabaci whiteflies.

A wide range of plant parasitic nematodes have been reported associated with cassava worldwide. These include Pratylenchus brachyurus, Rotylenchulus reniformis, Helicotylenchus spp., Scutellonema spp. and Meloidogyne spp., of which Meloidogyne incognita and Meloidogyne javanica are the most widely reported and economically important. Meloidogyne spp. feeding produces physically damaging galls with eggs inside them. Galls later merge as the females grow and enlarge, and they interfere with water and nutrient supply. Cassava roots become tough with age and restrict the movement of the juveniles and the egg release. It is therefore possible that extensive galling can be observed even at low densities following infection. Other pests and diseases can gain entry through the physical damage caused by gall formation, leading to rots. They have not been shown to cause direct damage to the enlarged storage roots, but plants can have reduced height if there was loss of enlarged root weight.

Research on nematode pests of cassava is still in the early stages; results on the response of cassava is, therefore, not consistent, ranging from negligible to seriously damaging. Since nematodes have such a seemingly erratic distribution in cassava agricultural fields, it is not easy to clearly define the level of direct damage attributed to nematodes and thereafter quantify the success of a chosen management method.

The use of nematicides has been found to result in lower numbers of galls per feeder root compared to a control, coupled with a lower number of rots in the storage roots. The organophosphorus nematicide femaniphos, when used, did not affect crop growth and yield parameter variables measured at harvest. Nematicide use in cassava is not terribly effective at increasing harvested yield, but lower infestation at harvest and lower subsequent storage loss provide a higher effective yield. The use of tolerant and resistant cultivars is the most practical management method in most locales.

This crop suffers from a rust,, caused by Uromyces manihotis.

Harvesting 
Cassava is harvested by hand by raising the lower part of the stem, pulling the roots out of the ground, and removing them from the base of the plant. The upper parts of the stems with the leaves are plucked off before harvest. Cassava is propagated by cutting the stem into sections of approximately 15 cm, these being planted prior to the wet season.

Postharvest handling and storage
Cassava undergoes post-harvest physiological deterioration (PPD) once the tubers are separated from the main plant. The tubers, when damaged, normally respond with a healing mechanism. However, the same mechanism, which involves coumaric acids, starts about 15 minutes after damage, and fails to switch off in harvested tubers. It continues until the entire tuber is oxidized and blackened within two to three days after harvest, rendering it unpalatable and useless. PPD is related to the accumulation of reactive oxygen species (ROS) initiated by cyanide release during mechanical harvesting. Cassava shelf life may be increased up to three weeks by overexpressing a cyanide-insensitive alternative oxidase, which suppressed ROS by 10-fold. PPD is one of the main obstacles preventing farmers from exporting cassavas abroad and generating income. Fresh cassava can be preserved like potato, using thiabendazole or bleach as a fungicide, then wrapping in plastic, coating in wax or freezing.

While alternative methods for PPD control have been proposed, such as preventing ROS effects by use of plastic bags during storage and transport, coating the roots with wax, or freezing roots, such strategies have proved to be economically or technically impractical, leading to breeding of cassava varieties more tolerant to PPD and with improved durability after harvest. Plant breeding has resulted in different strategies for cassava tolerance to PPD. One was induced by mutagenic levels of gamma rays, which putatively silenced one of the genes involved in PPD genesis, while another was a group of high-carotene clones in which the antioxidant properties of carotenoids are postulated to protect the roots from PPD.

Production 

In 2020, global production of cassava root was 303 million tonnes, with Nigeria as the world's largest producer, producing 20% of the world total (table). Other major growers were Democratic Republic of the Congo and Thailand.

Cassava is one of the most drought-tolerant crops, can be successfully grown on marginal soils, and gives reasonable yields where many other crops do not grow well. These conditions are common in certain parts of Africa and South America.

Toxicity 
Cassava roots, peels and leaves should not be consumed raw because they contain two cyanogenic glucosides, linamarin and lotaustralin. These are decomposed by linamarase, a naturally occurring enzyme in cassava, liberating hydrogen cyanide (HCN). Cassava varieties are often categorized as either bitter or sweet, signifying the presence or absence of toxic levels of cyanogenic glucosides, respectively. The so-called sweet (more accurately non-bitter) cultivars can produce as little as 20 milligrams of cyanide (CN) per kilogram of fresh roots, whereas bitter ones may produce more than 50 times as much (1 g/kg). Cassavas grown during drought are especially high in these toxins. A dose of 25 mg of pure cassava cyanogenic glucoside, which contains 2.5 mg of cyanide, is sufficient to kill a rat. Excess cyanide residue from improper preparation is known to cause acute cyanide intoxication, and goiters, and has been linked to ataxia (a neurological disorder affecting the ability to walk, also known as konzo). It has also been linked to tropical calcific pancreatitis in humans, leading to chronic pancreatitis.

Symptoms of acute cyanide intoxication appear four or more hours after ingesting raw or poorly processed cassava: vertigo, vomiting, and collapse. In some cases, death may result within one or two hours. It can be treated easily with an injection of thiosulfate (which makes sulfur available for the patient's body to detoxify by converting the poisonous cyanide into thiocyanate).

"Chronic, low-level cyanide exposure is associated with the development of goiter and with tropical ataxic neuropathy, a nerve-damaging disorder that renders a person unsteady and uncoordinated. Severe cyanide poisoning, particularly during famines, is associated with outbreaks of a debilitating, irreversible paralytic disorder called konzo and, in some cases, death. The incidence of konzo and tropical ataxic neuropathy can be as high as three percent in some areas."

During the shortages in Venezuela in the late 2010s, dozens of deaths were reported due to Venezuelans resorting to eating bitter cassava in order to curb starvation. Cases of cassava poisoning were also documented during the famine accompanying the Great Leap Forward (1958–1962) in China.

Societies that traditionally eat cassava generally understand that some processing (soaking, cooking, fermentation, etc.) is necessary to avoid getting sick. Brief soaking (four hours) of cassava is not sufficient, but soaking for 18–24 hours can remove up to half the level of cyanide. Drying may not be sufficient, either.

For some smaller-rooted, sweet varieties, cooking is sufficient to eliminate all toxicity. The cyanide is carried away in the processing water and the amounts produced in domestic consumption are too small to have environmental impact. The larger-rooted, bitter varieties used for production of flour or starch must be processed to remove the cyanogenic glucosides. The large roots are peeled and then ground into flour, which is then soaked in water, squeezed dry several times, and toasted. The starch grains that flow with the water during the soaking process are also used in cooking. The flour is used throughout South America and the Caribbean. Industrial production of cassava flour, even at the cottage level, may generate enough cyanide and cyanogenic glycosides in the effluents to have a severe environmental impact.

Uses

Alcoholic beverages

Culinary

Cassava-based dishes are widely consumed wherever the plant is cultivated; some have regional, national, or ethnic importance. Cassava must be cooked properly to detoxify it before it is eaten.

Cassava can be cooked in many ways. The root of the sweet variety has a delicate flavor and can replace potatoes. It is used in cholent in some households. It can be made into a flour that is used in breads, cakes and cookies. In Brazil, detoxified cassava is ground and cooked to a dry, often hard or crunchy meal known as farofa used as a condiment, toasted in butter, or eaten alone as a side dish.

Preparation

A safe processing method known as the "wetting method" is to mix the cassava flour with water into a thick paste, spread it in a thin layer over a basket and then let it stand for five hours at 30 °C in the shade. In that time, about 83% of the cyanogenic glycosides are broken down by the linamarase; the resulting hydrogen cyanide escapes to the atmosphere, making the flour safe for consumption the same evening.

The traditional method used in West Africa is to peel the roots and put them into water for three days to ferment. The roots are then dried or cooked. In Nigeria and several other west African countries, including Ghana, Cameroon, Benin, Togo, Ivory Coast, and Burkina Faso, they are usually grated and lightly fried in palm oil to preserve them. The result is a foodstuff called gari. Fermentation is also used in other places such as Indonesia (see Tapai). The fermentation process also reduces the level of antinutrients, making the cassava a more nutritious food. The reliance on cassava as a food source and the resulting exposure to the goitrogenic effects of thiocyanate has been responsible for the endemic goiters seen in the Akoko area of southwestern Nigeria.

A project called "BioCassava Plus" uses bioengineering to grow cassava with lower cyanogenic glycosides combined with fortification of vitamin A, iron and protein to improve the nutrition of people in sub-Saharan Africa.

Nutrition

Raw cassava is 60% water, 38% carbohydrates, 1% protein, and has negligible fat (table). In a  reference serving, raw cassava provides  of food energy and 25% of the Daily Value (DV) of vitamin C, but otherwise has no micronutrients in significant content (i.e. above 10% of the relevant DV). Cooked cassava starch has a digestibility of over 75%.

Cassava, like other foods, also has antinutritional and toxic factors. Of particular concern are the cyanogenic glucosides of cassava (linamarin and lotaustralin). On hydrolysis, these release hydrogen cyanide (HCN). The presence of cyanide in cassava is of concern for human and for animal consumption. The concentration of these antinutritional and unsafe glycosides varies considerably between varieties and also with climatic and cultural conditions. Selection of cassava species to be grown, therefore, is quite important. Once harvested, bitter cassava must be treated and prepared properly prior to human or animal consumption, while sweet cassava can be used after boiling.

Comparison with other major staple foods
A comparative table shows that cassava is a good energy source. In its prepared forms, in which its toxic or unpleasant components have been reduced to acceptable levels, it contains an extremely high proportion of starch compared to most staples. However, cassava is a poorer dietary source of protein and most other essential nutrients. Though an important staple, its main value is as a component of a balanced diet.

Comparisons between the nutrient content of cassava and other major staple foods when raw must be interpreted with caution because most staples are not edible in such forms and many are indigestible, even dangerously poisonous or otherwise harmful. For consumption, each must be prepared and cooked as appropriate.

Biofuel
In many countries, significant research has begun to evaluate the use of cassava as an ethanol biofuel feedstock. As a result, cassava (tapioca) chips have gradually become a major source of ethanol production. In November 2008, China-based Hainan Yedao Group invested US$51.5 million in a new biofuel facility that is expected to produce  a year of bioethanol from cassava plants.

Animal feed

Cassava tubers and hay are used worldwide as animal feed. Cassava hay contains high protein (20–27 percent crude protein) and condensed tannins (1.5–4 percent CP). It is valued as a good roughage source for ruminants such as cattle.

Laundry starch
Cassava is also used in a number of commercially available laundry products, especially as starch for shirts and other garments. Using cassava starch diluted in water and spraying it over fabrics before ironing helps stiffen collars.

Economic importance 

Cassava, yams (Dioscorea spp.), and sweet potatoes (Ipomoea batatas) are important sources of food in the tropics. The cassava plant gives the third-highest yield of carbohydrates per cultivated area among crop plants, after sugarcane and sugar beets. Cassava plays a particularly important role in agriculture in developing countries, especially in sub-Saharan Africa, because it does well on poor soils and with low rainfall, and because it is a perennial that can be harvested as required. Its wide harvesting window allows it to act as a famine reserve and is invaluable in managing labor schedules. It offers flexibility to resource-poor farmers because it serves as either a subsistence or a cash crop.

Worldwide, 800 million people depend on cassava as their primary food staple.  No continent depends as much on root and tuber crops in feeding its population as does Africa. In the humid and sub-humid areas of tropical Africa, it is either a primary staple food or a secondary costaple. In Ghana, for example, cassava and yams occupy an important position in the agricultural economy and contribute about 46 percent of the agricultural gross domestic product. Cassava accounts for a daily caloric intake of 30 percent in Ghana and is grown by nearly every farming family. The importance of cassava to many Africans is epitomised in the Ewe (a language spoken in Ghana, Togo and Benin) name for the plant, agbeli, meaning "there is life".

In Tamil Nadu, India, there are many cassava processing factories alongside National Highway 68 between Thalaivasal and Attur. Cassava is widely cultivated and eaten as a staple food in Andhra Pradesh and in Kerala. In Assam it is an important source of carbohydrates especially for natives of hilly areas.

In the subtropical region of southern China, cassava is the fifth-largest crop in terms of production, after rice, sweet potato, sugar cane, and maize. China is also the largest export market for cassava produced in Vietnam and Thailand. Over 60 percent of cassava production in China is concentrated in a single province, Guangxi, averaging over seven million tonnes annually.

See also

 Akyeke
 Attiéké a side dish made from cassava that is a part of the cuisine of Côte d'Ivoire in Africa
 Columbian Exchange
 Couac
 Fufu
 Kwanga
 Kasiri
 Maní (Amazonian legend)
 Tapioca industry of Thailand
 Yellow cassava

References

External links

 Cassava – Purdue University Horticulture
 Cassava Pests: From Crisis to Control
 Why cassava? Global Cassava Development Strategy 

Manihoteae
Biofuels
Caribbean cuisine
Central American cuisine
Crops originating from South America
Crops
Flora of Jamaica
Flora of South America
French Guianan cuisine
Jamaican cuisine
Root vegetables
Staple foods
Tropical agriculture
Tubers
Crops originating from indigenous Americans
Flora without expected TNC conservation status